Yengi Kand (also Romanized as Yengī Kand) is a village in Qaratureh Rural District, in the Central District of Divandarreh County, Kurdistan Province, Iran. At the 2006 census, its population was 292, in 57 families. The village is populated by Kurds.

References 

Towns and villages in Divandarreh County
Kurdish settlements in Kurdistan Province